At least three ships of the Hellenic Navy have borne the name Miaoulis or Navarchos Miaoulis (Ναύαρχος Μιαούλης, "Admiral Miaoulis") after Greek naval hero Andreas Miaoulis:

 , a cruiser launched in 1879 and scrapped in 1931.
 , a  launched in 1942 as HMS Modbury but transferred to Greece and renamed before completion. She was returned to the Royal Navy in 1959 and scrapped in 1960.
 , an  launched in 1944 as USS Ingraham she was transferred to Greece in 1971 and renamed. She was sunk as a target in 2001.

Hellenic Navy ship names